Falsimargarita nauduri is a species of sea snail, a marine gastropod mollusk in the family Calliostomatidae.

Description
The length of the shell attains 18.7 mm.

Distribution

References

 Warén A. & Bouchet P. (2001). Gastropoda and Monoplacophora from hydrothermal vents and seeps new taxa and records. The Veliger 44(2): 116-231

External links

nauduri
Gastropods described in 2001